Jin Nakatani (中谷 仁, born May 5, 1979) is a Japanese former professional baseball catcher in Nippon Professional Baseball (NPB). Following his retirement from the NPB, he managed at the  baseball team.

References

External links

NPB.com

1979 births
Living people
Baseball people from Wakayama Prefecture
Japanese baseball players
Nippon Professional Baseball catchers
Hanshin Tigers players
Tohoku Rakuten Golden Eagles players
Yomiuri Giants players
Japanese baseball coaches
High school baseball coaches